Hoplostethus is a genus of fish in the slimehead family.

Species
There are 30 species in this genus:
 Hoplostethus abramovi Kotlyar, 1986
 Hoplostethus atlanticus (Collett, 1889) - orange roughy
 Hoplostethus cadenati Quéro, 1974 - black slimehead
 Hoplostethus confinis Kotlyar, 1980
 Hoplostethus crassispinus Kotlyar, 1980
 Hoplostethus druzhinini Kotlyar, 1986
 Hoplostethus fedorovi (Kotlyar, 1986)
 Hoplostethus fragilis (F. de Buen, 1959) - Chilean roughy
 Hoplostethus gigas (McCulloch, 1914) - giant sawbelly
 Hoplostethus grandperrini C. D. Roberts & M. F. Gomon, 2012 - Grandperrin's giant sawbelly 
 Hoplostethus intermedius (Hector, 1875) - blacktip sawbelly
 Hoplostethus japonicus (Hilgendorf, 1879) - Western Pacific roughy
 Hoplostethus latus (McCulloch, 1914) - palefin sawbelly
 Hoplostethus marisrubri Kotlyar, 1986 - Red Sea roughy
 Hoplostethus mediterraneus (Cuvier, 1829) - Mediterranean slimehead, silver roughy
 Hoplostethus melanopeza C. D. Roberts & M. F. Gomon, 2012 - New Zealand giant sawbelly
 Hoplostethus melanopterus Fowler, 1938 - blackfin roughy
 Hoplostethus melanopus (M. C. W. Weber, 1913) - smallscale slimehead
 Hoplostethus mento (Garman, 1899) - slimy head
 Hoplostethus metallicus (Fowler, 1938) - metallic roughy
 Hoplostethus mikhailini (Kotlyar, 1986)
 Hoplostethus occidentalis (Woods, 1973) - western roughy
 Hoplostethus pacificus (Garman, 1899) - Eastern Pacific roughy
 Hoplostethus ravurictus (M. F. Gomon, 2008)
 Hoplostethus rifti (Kotlyar, 1986)
 Hoplostethus robustispinus (J. A. Moore & Dodd, 2010) - thickspine roughy
 Hoplostethus rubellopterus (Kotlyar, 1980)
 Hoplostethus shubnikovi (Kotlyar, 1980) - Metavay sawbelly
 Hoplostethus tenebricus (Kotlyar, 1980)
 Hoplostethus vniro (Kotlyar, 1995)

References

 
Taxa named by Georges Cuvier
Marine fish genera